Raghupati Dwarakanath Dixit (born 11 November 1974) is an Indian singer-composer, producer, and film score composer who is the frontman for the Raghu Dixit Project, a multilingual folk music band.

Dixit's music is an amalgamation of Indian ethnic music and styles from different parts of the world. His songs include "Mysore se aayi," "Jag Changa," "Antaragni," "Hey Bhagwan," "Har Saans Mein," "Gudugudiya," and "Khidki." Dixit has produced music for contemporary dance and theatre productions including the Indian contemporary dance group Nritarutya, of which, his wife, Mayuri Upadhya, is the artistic director.

Music

Dixit's self-titled debut album was launched by the music director duo Vishal–Shekhar on their new independent record label Vishal & Shekhar Music which collaborated with Counter Culture Records for this release. Raghu Dixit was the first artist on this new label. The album was also released on world music label Wrasse Records and Sony/ATV on 20 September 2010. The album reached No. 1 on the iTunes World Music charts in the UK. The title music for the show Splitsvilla was also composed and sung by Raghu Dixit. In the season one finale of The Dewarists, the Raghu Dixit Project collaborated with songwriter Rewben Mashangva on the song "Masti Ki Basti".

Collaborating with artists Dixit met during his previous concerts in the UK, the Raghu Dixit Project released their second studio album, Jag Changa. The album released on 23 November 2013. The album consists of eight tracks, in Kannada, Hindi and Tamil languages. In an interview with Vishnupriya Bhandaram of The Hindu, he mentions, "Every 200 kilometres in this country, languages change, the dialects change and the food changes, lives and lifestyles change and my music is unique and probably the USP is that it's sung in a vernacular tongue… its adds mystery."

Films
In 2008, he debuted as a music director in the Kannada film industry with Psycho. He also composed and sang a song in the Bollywood movie Quick Gun Murugan. His new Kannada films, Just Math Mathalli and Kote, released soundtracks which were a big hit with audiences.

Dixit made his Bollywood debut with the film Mujhse Fraaandship Karoge in 2011. In 2013 he debuted in Malayalam recording with Bijibal for North 24 Kaatham.

Concerts

Dixit has played many shows all over the world including in the United States, the UK, Korea, Japan, Russia, Hong Kong and India. He has performed at many music and cultural festivals, including Anwesha at IIT Patna, Alcheringa at IIT Guwahati, Incident at NITK-Surathkal, Aarohi at VNIT Nagpur, FIESTA at Infosys, the Glastonbury Festival, Mood Indigo, Jayciana at SJCE, Dhwani at College of Engineering Trivandrum,
Spring Fest at IIT Kharagpur, MANZAR at Institute of Chemical Technology, the Shrewsbury Folk Festival, at the Sardar Patel Vidyalaya in New Delhi and at MVJ College of Engineering in Bangalore.

In 2010, he appeared on BBC TV's Later... with Jools Holland which led to one of his songs becoming an instant download hit, and since then he has made several appearances at festivals in the UK and in Europe. In the early months of 2011, he gave a concert as part of London South Bank's 'Alchemy' Festival. He also visited the Andrew Marr Show to perform "Waiting for a Miracle" for a Raghu Dixit Session on BBC Radio 3.

In April 2012, he performed for Queen Elizabeth II of the United Kingdom and Prince Philip, at a Diamond Jubilee Pageant marking 60 years since her accession to the throne in 1952.

Recently he performed at Bangalore Times concert

Filmography

As composer

As playback singer

Web series

Award
 Dixit was awarded "Best Newcomer" at the 2011 Songlines Music Awards.
 Favorite Singer Award at the 2008 SFM Kalaa Awards
 Best Alternative Act at the UK Asian Music Awards
 Best Live Performer – GIMA Music Awards 2014

References

 Profile from Later... with Jools Holland performance on BBC2
 Review The Guardian

External links
 The Raghu Dixit Project official website
 

Indian male playback singers
Kannada film score composers
Musicians from Mysore
Indian rock music groups
1974 births
Living people
Musical groups established in 2005
Film musicians from Karnataka
Malayalam film score composers
Telugu film score composers
Hindi film score composers
20th-century Indian composers
21st-century Indian composers
Indian folk-pop singers
Indian male film score composers
20th-century Indian male singers
20th-century Indian singers
21st-century Indian male singers
21st-century Indian singers